The Valbona Pass is a high mountain pass within the Albanian Alps in northern Albania.

See also 

 Valbonë Valley National Park
 Theth National Park
 Geography of Albania
 Mountain passes of Albania

References 

 

Mountain passes of Albania
Geography of Kukës County
Valbonë Valley National Park